The 1923 Clemson Tigers football team represented Clemson College—now known as Clemson University—as a member of the Southern Conference (SoCon) during the 1923 college football season. Led by first-year head coach Bud Saunders, the Tigers compiled an overall record of 5–2–1 with a mark of 1–1–1 in conference play, tying for 11th place in the SoCon.

Schedule

References

Clemson
Clemson Tigers football seasons
Clemson Tigers football